Chelemys macronyx, also known as the Andean long-clawed mouse or Andean long-clawed akodont, is a species of rodent in the genus Chelemys of family Cricetidae. It is native to Argentina and Chile, where it is found in Patagonian  Nothofagus forest and adjacent grasslands.

References

Literature cited

Mammals of Argentina
Mammals of Chile
Chelemys
Mammals described in 1894
Taxa named by Oldfield Thomas
Taxonomy articles created by Polbot